Whichever Way the Ball Bounces, also known in English as If It Kills Me, is a 1974 Croatian film directed by Rajko Grlić.

References

External links

Whichever Way the Ball Bounces at Rajko Grlić's official website (as If It Kills Me)
Whichever Way the Ball Bounces at Hrfilm.hr 

1974 films
Croatian drama films
1970s Croatian-language films
Yugoslav drama films
Jadran Film films
Films directed by Rajko Grlić
1974 directorial debut films